The Badger-Illini Conference (known as the Tri-State Intercollegiate Conference from 1932 to 1939 and the Badger State Conference or Badger State Intercollegiate Conference from 1940 to 1947) was an intercollegiate athletic conference that existed from 1932 to 1956. It had members in the states of Illinois, Iowa, and Wisconsin. After the departure of certain members in 1956, the league subsequently became the Badger-Gopher Conference.

Football champions

Tri-State Intercollegiate Conference (1932–1939)

1932 – 
1934 –  and 
1935 – 
1936 – 
1937 – 
1938 – 
1939 –

Badger State Intercollegiate Conference (1940–1947)

1940 –  and 
1941 –  and 
1943 – No champion
1944 – No champion
1945 – No champion
1946 – 
1947 –  and

Badger-Illini Conference (1948–1956)

1948 –  and 
1949 – 
1950 – 
1951 – 
1952 – 
1953 – 
1954 – 
1955 –  and 
1956 –

References

 
College sports in Iowa
College sports in Illinois
College sports in Wisconsin